Christian Nydegger (born August 22, 2003) is an American soccer player who plays as a midfielder for MLS Next Pro club Real Monarchs.

Club career
Born in Highland, Utah, Nydegger began his career with La Roca FC. In 2018, Nydegger joined the youth setup at Major League Soccer club Real Salt Lake. In December 2019, during the Development Academy Winter Cup, Nydegger had to temporarily play goalkeeper in a match for the under-16s.

Nydegger made his senior debut for Real Monarchs, the Real Salt Lake affiliate club in the USL Championship, on May 8, 2021 against San Antonio. He came on as a 73rd minute substitute during the 2–2 draw.

On September 8, 2022, Nydegger joined USL League One's FC Tucson on loan for the remainder of the season.

International career
Nydegger has represented the United States in international futsal competition. In July 2015, Nydegger was selected into the under-12 futsal side. The next year, he was selected into the under-14 futsal squad for the Futsal World Cup under-14 tournament.

Career statistics

References

2003 births
Living people
People from Highland, Utah
American soccer players
Association football midfielders
Real Monarchs players
USL Championship players
Soccer players from Utah
MLS Next Pro players
FC Tucson players
USL League One players